Manvir Singh (born 15 June 2001), is an Indian professional footballer who plays as a forward for Indian Super League club NorthEast United.

Club career

Sudeva Delhi 
On 18 September 2020, Manvir signed contract with I-League at Sudeva Delhi.

NorthEast United 
On 31 October 2021, Manvir joined Indian Super League club NorthEast United on a three-year deal.

International
Manvir is also represented India national under-20 football team which won the recently concluded 2019 SAFF U-18 Championship in Bangladesh. He has made five appearances for India and scored two vital goals.

Career statistics

Club

Honours

India U-20
OFC Youth Development Tournament: 2019
SAFF U-18 Championship: 2019

Ozone FC
2017–18 Youth League U18 Top scorer

References 
6. Chennai City vs. Sudeva  Soccerway. Retrieved 3 February 2021.

External links 

Manvir Singh at FootballDatabase.eu
Manvir Singh at playmakerstats.com
Manvir Singh at India football federation
Manvir Singh at Instagram

2001 births
Living people
Indian footballers
Indian Arrows players
I-League players
Association football forwards
Kerala Blasters FC players
Ozone FC players
Sudeva Delhi FC players
NorthEast United FC players
Indian Super League players
India youth international footballers
People from Shaheed Bhagat Singh Nagar district
Footballers from Punjab, India